Amyttacta is a genus of bush-crickets or katydids, which contains the following species:

Amyttacta angolensis Beier, 1965
Amyttacta rhodesica Beier, 1965

Note: A. farrelli and A. marakelensis Naskrecki, Bazelet & Spearman, 2008 are now placed in the genus Naskreckia Gorochov, 2017.

References 

Tettigoniidae genera
Meconematinae